Beetlejuice is an animated television series that ran from September 9, 1989, to October 26, 1991, on ABC, and on Fox from September 9, 1991, to December 6, 1991. Loosely based on the 1988 film of the same name, it was developed by the film's director Tim Burton who also served as an executive producer. The animated series focuses on the life of Goth girl Lydia Deetz and her undead friend Beetlejuice as they explore The Neitherworld, a ghoulish wacky monster supernaturalistic realm inhabited by monsters, ghosts, ghouls, goblins and zombies. Danny Elfman's theme for the film was arranged for the cartoon series by Elfman himself.

Plot
Episodes generally centered on the ghostly con-man Beetlejuice, his best friend Lydia, and their supernatural adventures together in both the Neitherworld and the "mortal world", a New England town called Peaceful Pines ("Winter River" in the film). As in the film, Lydia could summon Beetlejuice out of the Neitherworld (or go there herself) by calling his name three times. The series' humor relied heavily on sight gags, wordplay, and allusiveness. Many episodes, especially towards the end of the run, were parodies of famous movies, books, and TV shows. The episode "Brides of Funkenstein" was based on an idea submitted by a then-teenage girl, who was a fan of the show.

Throughout the entire series, Beetlejuice would often try to scam residents of the Neitherworld—and, sometimes, the "mortal world" as well (Lydia's parents were occasionally unwitting victims of his pranks)—by various means, from "baby-sitting" (in which he literally sits on the grotesque Neitherworld babies) to trying to beat them in an auto race.

Episodes

Characters

Main
 Beetlejuice (voiced by Stephen Ouimette) – A ghost and the main and title character of the show, who enjoys eating bugs and is known throughout the Neitherworld as a prankster. He is the oldest son of Gnat and Bee Juice (who nag him to get a job and to keep clean, and who always address him as "Junior"), and he has a "disgustingly cheerful" younger brother, called Donny Juice (who, whether he realizes it or not, gets on his older brother's nerves). Beetlejuice was named after the star Betelgeuse. Beetlejuice is able to change shape, transform and conjure objects, teleport, and perform other feats of magic, although his powers can be reduced by various circumstances, such as when he feels fear, or when his head becomes separated from his body. At times, he must pause to think of exactly how to use his powers to escape a precarious situation unscathed. Due to what is later described in the series as his "juice" (his inborn source of magic), whenever Beetlejuice utters aloud a figure of speech, he or his surroundings change to act on the pun. Almost all of his transformations maintain the black-and-white striped pattern he wears on his suit, although sometimes the stripes are colored depending on the transformation. Though many Neitherworld denizens have some magic, it is Beetlejuice's greatly superior power that affords him the title—albeit mostly self-asserted—of "The Ghost With The Most" (another line borrowed from the movie). In fact, on multiple occasions, Beetlejuice was able to effortlessly subdue a number of supernatural beings, and his dis-corporeal, self-sentient brain once claims that his power is more than enough to conquer the whole Neitherworld. Because of that power, almost everyone in the Neitherworld is fair game for his pranks, though no more so than he himself, since he is not immune to careless use of his power. Sometimes Beetlejuice will mix up one of his transformations, due to homophone-based confusion (when Lydia told him to turn into a stake to fight off Count Me-In, he turned into a flank steak). At times, various of his body parts (including his feet and his entire torso) manifested minds of their own, independent of Beetlejuice's control, with his brain and even his entire skeletal system having to abandon him once. Beetlejuice's main pastime is pulling various pranks on the other denizens of the Neitherworld such as Jacques, Ginger, The Monster Across the Street, Poopsie, the Mayor and in the Living World it is Lydia's rival Claire Brewster and occasionally her parents. Beetlejuice's pranks on many seem to cause them great embarrassment or damage, but his pranks on Lydia, however, are only done to tease her, not to cause harm, which shows he cares for her. Lydia in fact seems to be the only person who has any control over Beetlejuice. He even said in one episode he would do anything for her, and she, in turn, reciprocates his feelings. Beetlejuice also constantly comes up with get-rich-quick con schemes to get money, as he dreads having to get a job, and in later episodes (particularly in the second half of the fourth season), Beetlejuice's greediness becomes so intense that he sometimes overlooks his friends and family, and even when Lydia openly scolds him, Beetlejuice shows unbelievable reluctance or unwillingness to give up of his schemes. Despite this cynical and childish attitude, Beetlejuice proves to be a profound and insightful person, frequently reciting quotes of philosophical and humanitarian importance. The things he hates include cleanliness and anything "cute". He expresses his likes and dislikes via variations on a single catchphrase, as in "Nerd humor you know I love it!" or "rules you know I hate 'em!" The only known thing Beetlejuice is afraid of is Sandworms, so much that he is unable to use his powers when he encounters them. However, on a few of occasions, Beetlejuice has managed to conquer his fear and use his magic to fight them. This is usually thanks to encouragement from Lydia, or if someone else is in danger. Lydia once stated to Judge Mental; "Beetlejuice couldn't use his powers to save himself, but he could do it for a baby." A number of times, Beetlejuice interacted with Lydia's parents in the "real world" of Peaceful Pines, always under the name of "Mr. Beetleman", and in a couple of instances, he performed a gender change on himself to become a teenage girl about Lydia's age at Lydia's school as "Mr. Beetleman's" younger female relative "Betty Juice", along with twice appearing as the male gender "Cousin BJ" claiming to be on Delia's side of the family.
 Lydia Deetz (voiced by Alyson Court) – A Goth girl in her preteens at the start of the series, and early teens later in the series. Lydia's favorite hobby is reading literary classics such as the collective works of writers such as Edgar Allan Poe, Stephen King and other Gothic and horror writers. She is established as being a creative, bright, lively, sharp, yet eccentric young girl, but otherwise Lydia's unique outlook on life makes her stand out from most of the other school-girls, which leaves her feeling out of place and alone in the real world, finding it difficult to fit in well with most of her classmates—leading her to frequently visit and seek out reassurance with her closest friend, Beetlejuice, in the Neitherworld, where she is accepted and loved for who she is. Lydia is a talented photographer, entomologist, seamstress, and artist with an affinity and love for all things gross, scary, weird, surreal and macabre, and who celebrates all that is (in the words of her film incarnation) 'strange and unusual'. Despite her love of all things 'strange and unusual', Lydia is also a positive, well-mannered, friendly and patient girl, and aside from also being emotionally mature for her age, Lydia can be accredited as being very responsible for a girl in her age group. Lydia is also shown to be a naturalist, shown to feel very strongly about environmental issues, even to the extent of chaining herself to a tree, which Beetlejuice soon brought to life to save it from being cut down. Lydia has also shown that she is extremely gifted with anything mechanical and understands a lot about cars (she knew what to do to build Doomie, while "Bee-gor" Beetlejuice did not know very much, such as what a carburetor is). In the series, Lydia attends Miss Shannon's School for Girls and is in the seventh grade. Lydia is Beetlejuice's best friend, and in the events of the pilot episode, "Critter Sitters", it is revealed she and Beetlejuice have already known each other for a year, as they are celebrating their first anniversary of friendship. Beetlejuice frequently addresses her as "Lyds" or "Babes" rather than "Lydia" though he does use her full name from time to time, like when he is scared, amused, or worried about her; for example: in "Worm Welcome" when Beetlejuice found out that "Worm Your Way" deodorant causes baby Sandworms to go crazy, he was scared Lydia would be eaten by the baby Sandworm, this, in turn, makes himself shout her name. Lydia knows how to summon Beetlejuice to her presence or make her own way to his: by calling his name aloud three times. Occasionally she is shown making use of a longer, more elaborate ritual using the aforementioned four-line chant to bring him out of the Neitherworld or send herself into it, but this seems not to be a necessity. Unlike Beetlejuice himself, Lydia is almost universally loved by the Neitherworld denizens, and she once won a Neitherworld award for Cutest Mortal to Ever Visit the Neitherworld. Having found herself a kindred spirit in Beetlejuice, Lydia looks up to Beetlejuice in many ways, primarily admiring his outrageous sense of humor. In one episode, Beetlejuice lent Lydia his funny bone so she could be funny as part of a school show, but without his funny bone Beetlejuice became much more serious and normal; this change in him even disappoints Jacques and Ginger. When Beetlejuice gets his funny bone back however, he becomes his abnormal self again much to Lydia's delight as she hugs him. It is revealed in "It's A Wonderful Afterlife", that if she had never met Beetlejuice, Lydia would have become an unhappy, social recluse, and not have had the confidence to stand up to Claire Brewster's bullying; indicating that Beetlejuice's friendship and dedication to her is the source of Lydia's own self-confidence. Although most of Beetlejuice's antics are motivated by self-amusement rather than malice, he can become genuinely hostile if Lydia is threatened, and any who might conceivably threaten their relationship. These are the objects of Beetlejuice's profound jealousy and resentment. However, Lydia never shows any romantic interest in anyone else except Prince Vince, and that quickly turns into a straight-out friendship. In the episode "Out of My Mind", Lydia is teleported inside Beetlejuice's mind, and it is learned that he actually has a working shrine to her in his head. During this time, she gave a donation towards the maintenance of his shrine to her.

Supporting

Peaceful Pines inhabitants 
 Charles Deetz (voiced by Roger Dunn) – Lydia's father, a nervous man who likes quiet and calm activities. He also has a terrible allergy to dogs. One of his favorite hobbies is ornithology, which he seems to be very fond of, and he also likes baseball. He is closer to Lydia than Delia is, as they share a love of baseball. He is often the victim of Beetlejuice's continuous pranks and mischief. Despite this, Beetlejuice is oddly quite fond of him, probably because Charles is one of the few people who is always falling for his pranks, usually when Beetlejuice is in his "real-world" guise of "Mr. Beetleman". Charles' catchphrase is "Try to relax. Try to relax."
 Delia Deetz (voiced by Elizabeth Hanna) – Charles Deetz's wife and Lydia's stepmother. Delia is an eccentric, air-headed yuppie, who is also somewhat self-absorbed. She deludes herself that she is both a great cook and a great artist, and hankers after new clients; however, both her cooking and her surreal art are not well received and Delia just cannot understand why her art is rejected or laughed at (paradoxically, while her weird art is rejected by living people, it is very popular in the Neitherworld). Also, due to her eccentric/air-headed/yuppie nature, Delia is not easily frightened, unlike her husband; being a surrealistic artist, she mistakenly thinks that the frightening things she experiences are part of something else. While she talks about wanting to express her creativity, she also tries to get Lydia to give up her love for scary stuff and focus on cute "normal" stuff (and doesn't notice the hypocrisy in her actions); this was emphasized briefly in "Critter Sitters" and was the plot of one of the stories in the comic book ("This is Your Lice", where Delia hires a hypnotist to make Lydia conform to doing normal, girly things). While in the film, the fact that Delia is Lydia's stepmother is made clear, in the cartoon this fact is never pressed upon.
 Percy – The Deetz family's pet black cat, an animal so high-strung that he makes Charles look relaxed. Considering the amount of torment that Beetlejuice puts Percy through, this is not really surprising. Although Percy is most times a victim of Beetlejuice's pranks, he sometimes manages to take revenge on him in more than one way.
 Bertha (voiced by Tara Charendoff) – Lydia's friend from school. She is tall, gangly and has an overbite. Bertha loves to swoon over teen boys, read teen magazines, and eat chips. Like Lydia, she too shares a passion for anything strange and unusual. Beetlejuice refers to her as 'Burp'.
 Prudence (voiced by Paulina Gillis) – Lydia's other friend from school who is a lot smaller than Bertha. Like Lydia and Bertha, Prudence is interested in anything strange and unusual but doesn't like anything too scary. She is a straight-A student who loves to read. Beetlejuice refers to her as 'Prune'. But he does appear to get on well with both her and Bertha (always in the guise of Bettyjuice). In the episode "Brides of Funkenstein", Beetlejuice helped Prudence become more confident during the group's brief time as a rock band. He also praised her and Bertha's bravery during a camping trip in the Neitherwoods when they saved him and Lydia from a sandworm attack. Also when Betty Juice was running for school president, he tried to get them on board supporting his campaign.
 Claire Brewster (voiced by Tara Charendoff) – Lydia's upperclass rival and Beetlejuice's second rival from school. Claire is the epitome of the 'spoiled little rich girl' stereotype and a typical spoiled princess; being overindulged by her parents, Claire believes everything should go her way and because of that, she clashes with Lydia, serving as a personality foil for Lydia in the series. Claire hates Lydia Deetz with a passion and swears to embarrass or outdo Lydia at every opportunity (usually because Lydia stands up to her), but the one person she hates more than Lydia is Beetlejuice as she would often be the target of some of his pranks. For the most part, Lydia tries to ignore Claire's scathing remarks, comments and attempts to humiliate her, not wanting to validate any of Claire's actions, but nevertheless there is many a time when Claire gets under her skin, and Lydia dreads being humiliated in front of Claire (see "Stage Fright", "Laugh of the Party", and "Caddy Shock"). Claire is a narcissist who believes she is the prettiest, beloved and most popular girl of all (though it is clear that nobody likes her), and abuses any power she's given (as seen in "Foreign Exchange"). Claire is not only egotistical and overtly vain, she is also outright cruel, unapologetic, and incredibly obnoxious and seems to have no redeeming values whatsoever; she also reacts very badly to anyone who (by her own definitions) is prettier than her. Claire's vanity and narcissism are further demonstrated in an episode where she and Lydia design a haunted house. Believing (due to her egotistical nature) that everyone would want to see "her in danger" she filled the house with cardboard cutouts of herself, rather than anything that was actually scary.

Neitherworld inhabitants 
 Jacques LaLean (voiced by Charles Kerr) – A French skeleton bodybuilder (a humorous reference to fitness guru Jack LaLanne) and neighbor of Beetlejuice. A running gag in the series entails Jacques getting broken into multiple pieces, often thanks to Beetlejuice, who will then proceed to call a number of random dogs upon him. In spite of such antics, Jacques actually likes Beetlejuice and it is revealed that Beetlejuice reciprocates this despite his vehement pretensions to the contrary. He pursues a dream of becoming a great bodybuilder, a mostly comedic endeavor as he has no muscles nor a body to devote fitness to, a fact he is very aware of but regardless does not take into consideration, and once against all odds (and believability) won the Mr. Neitherworld bodybuilding title, defeating the reigning champion Armhold Musclehugger (albeit by default). According to "Highs-Ghoul Confidential", Jacques and Ginger attended the same high school as Beetlejuice and went to the school prom together. During that time, Jacques was on the school train track team and had an overbite.
 Ginger the Tap Dancing Spider (voiced by Paulina Gillis) – A cute pink tap-dancing spider who speaks with a New York accent (this is a humorous allusion to Ginger Rogers). Another of Beetlejuice's neighbors, her act is often ruined by pranks of Beetlejuice. She dreams of someday being a famous tap dancer and can be very sensitive to cruel pranks. Although she is one of the innocent creatures in the Neitherworld, she has admitted that she stole a few dance steps from other living and dead dancers. According to "Highs-Ghoul Confidential", Ginger and Jacques attended the same high school as Beetlejuice and went to the school prom together. During that time, Ginger was on the school cheerleading squad and had magenta-colored hair in a fifties hairdo.
 The Monster Across the Street (voiced by Len Carlson) – A tall, hairy monster from the West who lives across the street from Beetlejuice. He would often be annoyed with Beetlejuice's shenanigans.
 Poopsie (voiced by Len Carlson) – The Monster's beloved and talented pet dog, one of Beetlejuice's favorite prank victims. Because of this, he strongly dislikes him, but he has the same affection towards Lydia as his owner. Poopsie's girlfriend is The Monstress Across the Street's dog Poopette. Poopsie is also one of Doomie's favorite targets when the roadster undergoes his Jekyll/Hyde transformation (see below).
 Doomie (voiced by Ron Rubin as Doomie, Colin Fox as Dragster of Doom) – Beetlejuice and Lydia's sentient, neon green car (resembling a 1960s Plymouth Fury or a Ford Thunderbird). The origin of his name is Lydia having desired to construct a "Dragster of Doom", though this title was only utilized in a single episode. Doomie is normally affable and friendly but due to the abnormal brain Beetlejuice gave him during his construction (à la Frankenstein's monster), Doomie transforms into a vicious werewolf-like monster in response to the presence of a Neitherworld dog near him, or to anger, fear, or the danger of his 'passengers', somewhat like a vehicular Jekyll and Hyde (correspondingly, even in his more sedate form he displays subtly dog-like traits such as panting, implying that he fills a pet-like role for Lydia and Beetlejuice). A recurring gag is for Doomie to turn into his "werewolf stage" to chase dogs around the Neitherworld (a flip-switch to dogs chasing cars). In later episodes, he is known to "speak", which is given as the sound of an engine turning over in ignition. It is at these times, Lydia usually plays a translator for him, as we understand a more complex, benevolent, and hopelessly romantic side to Doomie, such as when he began courting Mayor Maynot's convertible Pinky. Beetlejuice makes a point of claiming his ownership over Doomie and often demands his loyalty whenever Doomie should contradict him or is needed to aide in Beetlejuice's endeavors. However, Beetlejuice can be greatly apathetic to any plight of Doomie's, necessitating Lydia's persuasion to help him.
 Barry MeNot (voiced by Keith Knight) – A CGI character who pops up in the Neitherworld's commercials to promote a product revolving around a plot point in a humorous side.
 Bea Juice (voiced by Susan Roman) – The mother of Beetlejuice who is always picky about cleanliness.
 Nat Juice (voiced by Len Carlson) – The father of Beetlejuice who is always trying to get Beetlejuice to find a job.
 Mayor Maynot (voiced by Len Carlson) – The Mayor of the Neitherworld. In season one, he is a short green-skinned man in a top hat. In season two, he was redesigned to be a mummified monster of normal height. Mayor Maynot is always on Beetlejuice's case and continuously threatens to have him sent to Sandwormland.
 I.M. Smallhead – The small-headed assistant to Mayor Maynot where he always agrees with him. While he is shown to dislike Beetlejuice, he can be friendly to him at times. I.M. Smalllhead is loosely based on Harry the Hunter from the live-action film.
 Judge Mental (voiced by Len Carlson) – The Neitherworld's residential judge who would always threaten to sentence Beetlejuice to be condemned to Sandwormland when Beetlejuice ends up on trial in his courtroom.
 Mr. Monitor (voiced by John Stocker) – A humanoid with four televisions for a head. He runs the Neitherworld TV Network where he is always keeping an eye on the ratings.
 Armhold Musclehugger (voiced by Keith Knight) – First appeared in the fourth-season episode "Raging Skull"; a parody of Arnold Schwarzenegger (even speaking in a parody of Schwarzenegger's Austrian accent) and the former Mr. Neitherworld bodybuilding champion (until dethroned by Jacques, with some help from Beetlejuice). He is green-skinned with a blond crew-cut hairstyle and wears only bodybuilder briefs. As Mr. Neitherworld, he is extremely arrogant, but when he reappears in the episode "Goody Two-Shoes" he is more affable (while still proud of his physique). Later on, he becomes more toadying and goes to work for Chester Slime as his well-muscled right-hand man.
 Scuzzo and Fuzzo (voiced by Joseph Sherman and David Goldberg) – Two trouble-making clowns and the rivals of Beetlejuice.
 Sandworms – Huge purple and green snake-like creatures with four eyes and stegosaurus-like spines on their backs that reside in the desert region of Sandwormland which is below the Neitherworld. Beetlejuice is very weary of them.

Voice cast 

 Stephen Ouimette – Beetlejuice, Snugglejuice, Posijuice, Negajuice
 Alyson Court – Lydia Deetz
 Elizabeth Hanna – Delia Deetz, Miss Shannon
 Roger Dunn – Charles Deetz
 Harvey Atkin – Lipscum, Exorcist
 Tara Strong (credited as Tara Charendoff) – Bertha, Claire Brewster, Little Miss Warden
 Len Carlson – The Monster Across the Street, Judge Mental, Barf Birfman, Mayor Maynot, Mr. Juice, Uncle Clyde, Messy Jesse, Foreman, Hopalong Casualty, Poopsie
 Tabitha St. Germain (as Paulina Gillis) as Prudence, Ginger
 Keith Knight – Barry MeNot, Flubbo, Armhold Musclehugger, Chester Slime, Dr. Zigmund Void
 Ron Rubin – Germs Pondscum, Doombuggy
 Colin Fox – Dragster of Doom
 Keith Hampshire – Doomie
 Joseph Sherman – Scuzzo the Clown
 David Goldberg – Fuzzo the Clown
 Stuart Stone – Ramon
 Dan Hennessey – Jesse Germs, Captain Kidder, Bully the Crud
 Peggy Mahon – Mrs. Bugsley, Aunt May
 Susan Roman – Miss Shapen, Percy, Poopette, The Monstress Across the Street, Mrs. Juice
 Richard Binsley – Donnyjuice, Wyatt Burp
 Don Francks – Count Mein, Mr. Big
 Michael Stark – Fleagor
 Charles Kerr – Jacques
 Allan Stewart Coates – Ed
 John Stocker – Mr. Monitor, Bartholomew Batt
 Hadley Kay – Prince Vince

Production 
Following the major critical and commercial success of the Beetlejuice film in early 1988, it led to an animated spin-off series being created by Warner Bros. Television. The production was provided by the Canadian Nelvana Ltd., The Geffen Film Company and Tim Burton, Inc. The series premiered on September 9, 1989, on ABC.

The animated series was a mega breakout hit for ABC in its initial seasons, and later became one of the first cartoon animated series to ever air on Fox's weekday afternoons children's lineup, though also remaining on ABC's Saturday morning schedules, making it one of the first animated shows to air concurrently on two different U.S. broadcast networks.

The premise of the animated series differs in a number of ways from the original Beetlejuice live-action film. In the TV series, he and Lydia are best friends, Beetlejuice is made out to be more of a prankster, and Lydia is given a much quirkier, but positive demeanor. Lydia often travels to the 'Neitherworld' (changed from 'Afterlife') to have adventures with Beetlejuice. These adventures could involve fun activities together, Lydia saving Beetlejuice from a bad situation, or scolding him for a money making scam.

Merchandise 
Much as with the original 1988 film, various merchandise was released for the Beetlejuice animated series in 1990. This included trading cards by Dart, a sticker album and sticker/activity book by Panini, a jigsaw puzzle by Golden, a coloring book, novels, a lunchbox and thermos set, Valentine's, a party centerpiece by Party Creations, a PC game by Hi Tech Expressions, a Game Boy game by Rare, and six PVC figures available with Burger King Kids' Meals. Kenner, the company behind the film's action figures, had begun developing figures for the animated series, but the project did not come to fruition (at least one prototype for that ill-fated collection has been showcased online).

Home media 
Warner Bros. released most of the first season of the show on six video-cassettes by December 21, 1993. On September 16, 2008, three episodes ("A-ha", "Skeletons in the Closet", and "Spooky Boo-Tique" were released as bonus features on the film's 20th Anniversary Deluxe Edition DVD.

On November 5, 2012, it was announced that Time Life (under Warner Home Video license) had acquired the rights to the series and planned to release it on DVD in 2013.  On May 28, 2013, Shout! Factory released Beetlejuice – The Complete Series on DVD in Region 1 as an Amazon exclusive. They also released Season 1 on the same day to retail stores.  Seasons 2 & 3 were released on March 18, 2014.

Awards 
Daytime Emmy Awards
 1990 – Outstanding Animated Program (Won) (Tied with The New Adventures of Winnie the Pooh)

See also 
 List of ghost films

References

External links 

 
 
 Beetlejuice at Don Markstein's Toonopedia. Archived from the original on February 22, 2018.
 Press release detailing Toontopia TV which will feature Beetlejuice
 Beetlejuice at Retro Junk
 

1980s American animated television series
1990s American animated television series
1989 American television series debuts
1991 American television series endings
1980s Canadian animated television series
1990s Canadian animated television series
1989 Canadian television series debuts
1991 Canadian television series endings
American Broadcasting Company original programming
American children's animated comedy television series
American children's animated fantasy television series
American children's animated horror television series
Canadian children's animated comedy television series
Canadian children's animated fantasy television series
Canadian children's animated horror television series
Nickelodeon original programming
Daytime Emmy Award for Outstanding Animated Program winners
Fox Kids
Fox Broadcasting Company original programming
Animated television shows based on films
YTV (Canadian TV channel) original programming
Animated television series about children
Television series by Nelvana
Television series by Warner Bros. Television Studios
Television shows set in Connecticut
Animated television series about ghosts
English-language television shows
Beetlejuice